Monique van der Vorst (born 20 November 1984, Gouda) is a Dutch racing cyclist. She is a two-time silver medal winner at the Paralympic Games.

After having a leg operation at the age of 13, her legs became paralyzed.

In March 2010, when she was 25 years old, Van der Vorst had an accident, where she was rammed by another cyclist while riding her hand cycle. Some months after this incident, she claimed to regain feeling in both her legs, after which she claimed to retrain herself to walk.

However, Spiegel Online has now reported that Van der Vorst was able to stand and walk during her career as a paraplegic handbiker, and that her neighbors had even reported seeing her dancing while supposedly paralyzed.

Eventually, Van der Vorst began road cycling, and has been signed to the Rabobank Women's Cycling team.

References

External links
Official website
 Un-paralyzed Article

1984 births
Living people
Dutch female cyclists
Cyclists at the 2008 Summer Paralympics
Paralympic cyclists of the Netherlands
Paralympic silver medalists for the Netherlands
Sportspeople from Gouda, South Holland
Medalists at the 2008 Summer Paralympics
Paralympic medalists in cycling
Cyclists from South Holland
20th-century Dutch women
21st-century Dutch women